Leptophallidae is a family of trematodes belonging to the order Plagiorchiida.

Genera:
 Paralepoderma Dollfus, 1950

References

Plagiorchiida